The 2017 FIM MotoGP World Championship was the premier class of the 69th F.I.M. Road Racing World Championship season.

The 2017 season saw the début of the KTM RC16, which was previously used by Red Bull KTM Factory Racing at the 2016 Valencian Grand Prix ahead of a full season début.

Season summary 
Marc Márquez started the season as defending World Champion, having secured his fifth overall title at the 2016 Japanese motorcycle Grand Prix with three races remaining.

Whilst Yamaha's new rider Maverick Viñales started the season off with two consecutive victories, the following spring season proved to be unpredictable with four different winners in as many races, following the trend from 2016. Ducati rider Andrea Dovizioso then took his first dry-track MotoGP win at Mugello before repeating the feat the following week in Barcelona. Márquez took the championship lead after winning the German Grand Prix. He held the championship lead until the British Grand Prix, where Dovizioso regained the lead after Márquez's engine blew up late in the race. Márquez bounced back immediately to take consecutive victories in the next two rounds to reestablish himself as championship leader. Over the following three races, Dovizioso claimed two more wins to Márquez's one, but a poor result in Australia for the Ducati rider meant that Márquez's points lead remained intact.

Going into the final round in Valencia Márquez topped the standings, 21 points ahead of Dovizioso, with both riders winning six races apiece. Viñales was third, 56 points behind Márquez. Therefore, Márquez needed to finish 11th or higher to guarantee a championship, whereas Dovizioso was forced under all circumstances to win in Valencia.

Márquez was on pole in Valencia, and Dovizioso started 9th. After Márquez saved a high-speed potential crash into turn 1, he dropped back behind Dovizioso. The title chances of Dovizioso ended when he crashed with five laps of the race remaining, losing the hope in taking the championship. Meanwhile, Márquez finished third behind Dani Pedrosa and the season's top rookie and independent rider Johann Zarco. Márquez won his sixth title and fourth MotoGP title overall.

Calendar
The following Grands Prix took place in 2017:

 ‡ = Night race

Calendar changes
 The Austrian and Czech Republic Grand Prix swapped places, with the Czech Republic hosting the tenth round, while Austria hosts the eleventh round.
 The British Grand Prix was scheduled to move from Silverstone to the new Circuit of Wales, but construction on the new track had not commenced. The two circuits reached a deal which would see Silverstone continue to host the British Grand Prix in 2017, with an option to host the 2018 race.

Teams and riders

All the bikes used Michelin tyres.

Team changes
 Austrian manufacturer KTM joined the series with a factory-supported team for the first time.

Rider changes
 Jorge Lorenzo joined Ducati, after leaving Movistar Yamaha MotoGP. Lorenzo's move to Ducati ended his nine-year relationship with Yamaha.
 Maverick Viñales joined Yamaha, after leaving Team Suzuki Ecstar.
 Andrea Iannone joined Team Suzuki Ecstar, after leaving Ducati. He was partnered by Álex Rins who moved up to the premier class.
 Bradley Smith and Pol Espargaró left Tech 3 Yamaha to join the newly formed Red Bull KTM factory team for the 2017 season.
 Aleix Espargaró joined Aprilia Racing Team Gresini, after leaving Team Suzuki Ecstar. He was partnered by Sam Lowes who moved up to the premier class.
 Jonas Folger and Johann Zarco, the 2015 and 2016 Moto2 World Champion, moved up to the premier class, débuting with Monster Yamaha Tech 3.
 Stefan Bradl and Eugene Laverty left MotoGP for the Superbike World Championship.
 Álvaro Bautista left Aprilia Racing Team Gresini to return to Aspar Team. Bautista previously competed with Aspar Team between the 2006 125cc and the 2009 250cc seasons.
 Karel Abraham returned to MotoGP with Aspar Team after previously competing in the Superbike World Championship in the 2016 season.
 Yonny Hernández returned to Moto2, after being left without a ride in MotoGP.

Regulation changes

Technical regulations
 Winglets, additional aerodynamic aids first introduced in 1999, will be banned from 2017 following repeated concerns about their safety.

Sporting regulations
 A rider may be assisted by no more than four mechanics while changing bikes during a pit stop, all of whom must wear approved helmets. A mechanic may hold in the bike's clutch lever, but only the rider is allowed to select a gear.

Results and standings

Grands Prix

Riders' standings
Scoring system
Points were awarded to the top fifteen finishers. A rider had to finish the race to earn points.

Constructors' standings
Scoring system
Points were awarded to the top fifteen finishers. A rider had to finish the race to earn points.

 Each constructor got the same number of points as their best placed rider in each race.

Teams' standings
The teams' standings were based on results obtained by regular and substitute riders; wild-card entries were ineligible.

Notes

References

External links
 The official website of Grand Prix motorcycle racing

 
MotoGP
Grand Prix motorcycle racing seasons